Rahim Khan was the fifth Khan of Ganja, who ruled only briefly in 1786.

Life 
He was the youngest son of Shahverdi Khan of Ganja. He was forced to take refuge in Georgia when his half-brother Muhammad Khan of Ganja usurped the throne in 1778. He succeeded Hajji Beg in 1785 with help from Heraclius II. However, after death of Ahmad Khan Donboli in 1786, Ibrahim Khalil of Karabakh's major ally, later moved on to strengthen himself at the expense of Ganja. In the early spring of 1786, at the insistence of Ibrahim Khan, his brother-in-law the Avar Umma Khan, attacked Ganja and "having taken 5,000 rubles of indemnity from this city," failing to completely capture Ganja, retreated to Shusha, leaving, however, part of the troops near the river Kura. Later in May, Ibrahim Khalil himself arrived in vicinity of the city. On June 25, Ibrahim while keeping the city under siege, sent his envoy Hazrat Qoli bey (former governor of Ganja for Karabakh) to Tiflis to Heraclius and offered him to send Prince Kaikhosro Andronikashvili (also former governor of Ganja for Georgia) with the army, "to rule as before". Heraclius was forced to agree, although it was not in his interests to share power in Ganja with Ibrahim Khan. However, the tense situation in the border regions with Akhaltsikhe required the constant presence of the tsarist troops there. Heraclius in return sent Hazrat Qoli to Rahim, suggesting him to surrender to Ibrahim Khalil. 

Thus, Rahim ruled for a year and was deposed by the Georgia officially but Karabakh Khanate was the main instigator.

Family 
He was married to Bajikhanum, a commoner and had a son named Imam Qoli Khan. Imam Qoli had 4 sons and a daughter.

References

Sources 

 

Khans of Ganja